Stanislav Mykolayovych Horuna is a Ukrainian athlete (karate) in the category of kumite (75 kg). He was born on March 1, 1989, in Lviv. 
A bronze medalist of 
European Championship 2018 in an individual and team category. Silver medalist of European Championship 2014, silver medalist of European Championship 2017 in individual category and bronze medalist in team category in kumite, bronze medalist of World Championship 2014, three-time winner of series of tournaments K1 Premier League (2013, 2014, 2017), six-time champion of Ukraine in karate. Champion of European Games 2019 and Worlsd Games 2019. Qualified for Olimpic Games in Tokyo (2020) Honoured master of sport of international class. A captain of Ukrainian national team. 
2nd on voting Athlete of the year 2019 according to IWGA.

Biography
He was born in Lviv, in family of businessmen. Went to Lviv high school No. 53 with profound learning of English language (from 2007 is a gymnasium "Prestige" with profound learning of foreign languages). In 2011 finished the faculty of law in Lviv National University of Ivan Franco, area of expertise — jurisprudence. Lives in Lviv, practicing lawyer.

Passion for sport showed up in early years: Stanislav visited sessions of Taekwondo, however in age 13 he visited karate practice of Anton Nikulin, after that he fully devoted himself to this kind of martial arts. Soon his younger brother — Yaroslav Horuna started practicing in the Lviv club of sporting karate "Union" and is the champion of Ukraine in karate in category 84 kg

The first and only trainer of Stanislav is Anton Nikulin.

Among the hobbies of the Ukrainian karate athlete are sky diving, snowboarding, tennis.

Stanislav Horuna is one of the characters in online game "KARATE-DO".

As of March 2022, he is a Ukrainian soldier after Russia invaded Ukraine in February 2022.

Career
Stanislav Horuna became first Ukrainian karate athlete that won a medal in World Championship among adults (bronze, Bremen,  2014). However, ambiguous judging during the fight of Stanislav with Japanese Тані Руічі Tani Ryuichi for reaching the final of Championship caused a discussion,  at first the winner of duel was named Stanislav Horuna. But a judicial assembly recalls athletes on tatami and declares the winner of fight and finalist of Championship Japanese athlete. Within the framework of 22-th World Championship in karate this duel is considered most controversial (and, not only on tatami, but also in the political aspect).

Stanislav heads the rating of series of competitions K1 Premier League and declares the winner (Grand Winner) of Premiere-league three times in 2013, 2014 and 2017. The serious injury of knee in 2015 forced one of world leaders in karate to stop training and, accordingly, participating in competitions. In 2017 on K1 Premier League Paris Open 2017 (this premiere league became the most massive in history of competitions (1243 athletes from 78 countries of the world)) Stanislav triumphally returns on the first step of pedestal in France. Conducting 7 fights, Horuna brings the gold medal to Ukraine in the most numerous (140 participants from 42 countries) category.

European Champion
On May 22, 2021, in the final of the European Championship, he defeated the legend of world karate Rafael Aghayev by a ratio of 3: 1, when he kicked his head, coach Anton Nikulin demanded the control of video judges and they recognized three points 6 seconds before the end. For the first time in his career, he became the European Champion in karate - men's kumite -75 kg.

Sport achievements

World Championships

World Cups

European Championships

K1 Premier Leagues

Another competitions

Titles
 Vice-sportsman of 2019 according to IWGA
 The best sportsmen of Lviv region in February 2018
 Sportsmen of the year in 2014
 The best sportsmen of Lviv region in January 2017
 The best sportsmen of Lviv region in July 2017 as a result of achievements on World Games in Wroclaw (first gold medal of this competition in Lviv)
 Medalist of the Order for Merit, 3rd Class
 Medalist of the Order for Merit, 2nd Class

Achievements 

 7th in top-10 best athletes in Ukraine in 2014 according to Ukrainian Sports Press Association
 7th in top-10 athletes-nonolympians for 25 years of independency of Ukraine
 10th in rating of 10 most important achievements of Ukrainian athletes in 2014

Sources 

1. Born to win: Stanislav Horuna and Anton Nikulin about the success on Open-de-Paris 2017
http://karate.ru/news/2017-02-02/rozhdennye-pobezhdat-stanislav-goruna-i-anton-nikulin-paris-2017/

2. Stas Horuna: «Want something bigger — become better!»
http://karate.ru/articles/stas-goruna-hochesh-bolshego-stanovis-luchshim/

3. Ukrainian karate athletes won medals of World Championship for the first time 
http://comments.ua/sport/495298-ukrainskie-karatisti-vpervie-zavoevali.html

4. Ukrainian S. Horuna was the best on World competition in France
http://comments.ua/sport/495298-ukrainskie-karatisti-vpervie-zavoevali.html

5. Citizen of Lviv Stanislav Horuna — bronze medalist of WC-2014 in karate
http://ns3.for.lviv.ua/novyny/suspilstvo/35453-lviv-ianyn-stanislav-horuna-bronzovyi-pryzer-chs-2014-z-karate

6. Stanislav Horuna: the art of power, will and endurance
http://zaxid.net/news/showNews.do?stanislav_goruna_mistetstvo_sili_voli_ta_vitrivalosti&objectId=79091

7. Karate athlete from Lviv Stanislav Horuna — winner of international competition.

8. Ukraine's Stanislav Horuna wins Kosovo's TOP 10 for 2nd time
https://web.archive.org/web/20151015234756/http://www.karate-news.net/ukraines-stanislav-horuna-wins-kosovos-top-10-for-2nd-time/

9.  Citizen of Lviv Stanislav Horuna won historical medal on World Championship in karate
http://dailylviv.com/news/sport/lvivyanyn-stanislav-horuna-zdobuv-istorychnu-medal-na-chempionati-svitu-z-karate-12858

References 

 Profile on web-page of Sport Сommittee of Ukraine
 Profile on web-page of Ukrainian Federation of karate 
 Official Facebook page
  Horuna Fanpage 
 Profile on Instagram

External links 
 
 

1989 births
Living people
Ukrainian male karateka
European champions for Ukraine
World Games gold medalists
World Games silver medalists
World Games medalists in karate
Competitors at the 2017 World Games
Competitors at the 2022 World Games
Karateka at the 2019 European Games
European Games medalists in karate
European Games gold medalists for Ukraine
Karateka at the 2020 Summer Olympics
Olympic karateka of Ukraine
Olympic medalists in karate
Medalists at the 2020 Summer Olympics
Olympic bronze medalists for Ukraine
Sportspeople from Lviv